Dim sum bonds are bonds issued outside of China but denominated in Chinese renminbi, rather than the local currency.  They are named after dim sum, a popular style of cuisine in southern China.

History and use 
The first dim sum bond was issued by the China Development Bank in July 2007. Until July 2010, only Chinese and Hong Kong banks could issue renminbi-denominated bonds; deregulation led to the development of an offshore market in renminbi and the internationalization of dim sum bonds. The bonds became more popular as foreign companies sought yuan-denominated assets as the renminbi appreciated in 2011.  Although the major market for dim sum bonds is Hong Kong, China Construction Bank became the first Chinese Bank to issue a renminbi denominated bond in London in November, 2012.  This followed similar issues by non-Chinese banks like ANZ, HSBC and Banco do Brasil earlier in the year.

35.7 billion yuan in dim sum bonds were issued in 2010 and 131 billion in 2011.

The first foreign-issued dim sum bond by a nonfinancial company was announced on August 19, 2010 and issued on September 16, 2010 by McDonald's.   On 5 November 2013, British Columbia finance minister Mike de Jong reported a successful placement of Chinese RMB$2.5bn in dim sum bonds, listed January 14, 2014 on the Luxembourg Stock Exchange.  The issue was five times oversubscribed.

Some Indian companies participate in the dim sum bond market, one of them being IL & FS Transportation networks (a subsidiary of the giant lender IL & FS Financial Services).

See also
 Foreign currency denominated bond
Panda bond
Kungfu bond
Eurobond
 Schengen bond

Sources

Bonds in foreign currencies
Renminbi